The 2020 Categoría Primera B season (officially known as the 2020 Torneo BetPlay Dimayor season for sponsorship reasons) was the 31st season of the Categoría Primera B since its founding as Colombia's second division football league. The tournament started on 31 January and ended on 26 December 2020, with Atlético Huila winning their third title in the competition after defeating Cortuluá in the finals.

The competition was suspended from 13 March to 17 September due to the COVID-19 pandemic.

Format
For this season, and prior to the COVID-19 pandemic, the format was originally planned to be the same as the previous season: two tournaments (Torneo I and Torneo II) with three stages each. In the first stage of both tournaments, the 16 clubs would play each other once, for a total of 15 games. The top eight teams after the first stage would advance to the semifinal round where they would be sorted into two groups of four to play a double round-robin tournament group stage, with the top team of each group qualifying for the finals. The winners of both tournaments would play a final series on a home-and-away basis, with the winner being crowned as season champions and also earning promotion to the Categoría Primera A for the 2021 season. The season runners-up would then play the best team in the aggregate table (other than the champions) in another double-legged series for the second promotion berth. In case the season runner-up also ended up as the best team in the aggregate table, it would also be promoted and the promotion play-off would not be played.

On 25 July 2020, DIMAYOR's General Assembly decided to continue playing the Torneo I as the only tournament to be held in the season, with the winners of that tournament being crowned as champions and earning automatic promotion to the top flight. The promotion play-off, if needed, would still be played by the runners-up and the best team in the aggregate table other than the champions. On 13 August 2020, DIMAYOR decided that there would not be any teams relegated from Primera A at the end of the season, meaning that this tournament would not award its champion a berth into the next year's Primera A tournament and that the promotion play-off would also be cancelled.

Teams
16 teams took part, fourteen of them returning from last season plus Unión Magdalena and Atlético Huila, who were relegated from the Primera A the previous season. Both teams replaced Deportivo Pereira and Boyacá Chicó who earned promotion at the end of the last season.

Effects of the COVID-19 pandemic
On 13 March 2020, after a meeting with its member clubs, DIMAYOR announced the temporary suspension of the tournament, along with the Primera A and Copa Colombia ones, due to the COVID-19 pandemic.

On 29 June, and after an Assembly of its member clubs, DIMAYOR presented a timetable for the implementation of the biosecurity protocol to resume its competitions, with COVID-19 testing for players and staff members of every club scheduled to be held from 10 to 15 July, and individual training resuming the following day. The resumption of collective training sessions, scheduled for 20 August, would be subject to government approval. According to said timetable, the league was scheduled to resume on 27 August, pending the fulfillment of the previous stages as well as final approval by the Colombian government. On 25 July, it was announced that the competition would resume on 30 August with alterations in its format, and pending government approval. With the Ministry of Health authorizing stages 4 and 5 of the biosecurity protocol (collective trainings and competition, respectively) on 20 August, and due to some adjustments to the protocol requested by DIMAYOR, that date of resumption had to be pushed back for at least two weeks, to mid-September.

On 31 August, the Ministry of Health issued the resolution that approved the adjusted protocol and greenlit the start of collective training sessions for 1 September, while President of DIMAYOR Fernando Jaramillo confirmed that the tournament would resume on 19 September. On 3 September, DIMAYOR notified its associate clubs that the eighth round of the competition would be played in the weekend of 19–20 September, with a meeting to confirm the competition format to be held on 9 September.

First stage

Standings

Results

Matchdays 1–15

Matchdays 16–17
Upon the conclusion of the first fifteen matchdays of the first stage, teams played two additional games in double-legged ties, with the teams ranked from first to eighth place after the fifteenth round being seeded and paired against a rival ranked in the bottom half of the table at that point, which were decided by a draw held on 2 November 2020. The seeded teams played at home on Matchday 17.

Semifinals
The eight teams that advanced to the semifinals were drawn into two groups of four teams. The winners of each group advanced to the finals.

Group A

Group B

Finals

Atlético Huila won 4–1 on aggregate.

Top goalscorers

Source: Soccerway

Aggregate table

See also
 2020 Categoría Primera A season
 2020 Copa Colombia

References

External links 
  

Categoría Primera B seasons
1
Colombia
Colombia